Heads & Tales is the first studio album by the American singer/songwriter Harry Chapin, released in 1972. The album contains Chapin's first hit, "Taxi." The album and single both charted successfully for over six months, with both selling over 1 million copies each.

Early LP pressings of Heads & Tales featured a die-cut front cover with a square hole in it, allowing the "cover" photo of Chapin (which is actually on an enclosed poster/lyric sheet) to be seen through the hole, creating a three-dimensional effect.

"Taxi" was released as a 45 rpm single, and charted at number 24 on the Billboard Hot 100.

Track listing

Personnel
 Harry Chapin - guitar, vocals
 Steve Chapin - keyboards
 Russ Kunkel - drums, percussion
 Ronald Palmer - guitar, vocals
 Tim Scott - cello
 John Wallace - bass, vocals

Charts and certifications

Charts

Certifications

References

1972 debut albums
Harry Chapin albums
Albums produced by Jac Holzman
Elektra Records albums